Daniel Reed (born 5 December 1989) is a British table tennis player. He competed for England in the men's team and the mixed doubles events at the 2014 Commonwealth Games where he won a silver and bronze medal respectively.

See also
 List of England players at the World Team Table Tennis Championships

References

External links

1989 births
Living people
English male table tennis players
Commonwealth Games silver medallists for England
Commonwealth Games bronze medallists for England
Table tennis players at the 2014 Commonwealth Games
Commonwealth Games medallists in table tennis
Medallists at the 2014 Commonwealth Games